The Morecambe gas fields are two major natural gas producing fields in Morecambe Bay in the Irish Sea, 27 km west of Blackpool.

The fields 
The Morecambe South field is in UK Block 110/2a and extends into Blocks 110/3a, 110/8a, 110/7a; Morecambe North is in Block 110/2a. The fields were discovered in September 1974 and February 1976 respectively.  The fields are named after a light-ship station, they are sometimes erroneously called Morecambe Bay.

The gas reservoir is a Triassic sandstone and has the following characteristics.

Owner and operator 
In 1985 the sole licensee of the field and the operator was Hydrocarbons GB Limited. This had become British Gas E & P Ltd by 1994, then Centrica plc in 1997. In 2017, Centrica launched Spirit Energy a joint venture with German energy and infrastructure company Stadtwerke München (SWM). Spirit Energy assumed ownership of the Morecambe gas fields.

Development 
The Morecambe gas fields development was to provide peak UK demand for gas in the winter. Morecambe South was developed around a central drilling, production and accommodation complex. This comprised three bridge linked platforms plus a bridge-linked flare tower. Details of the platforms are as shown.

The central complex Flare tower (53.846667N 3.580556W) is linked by a bridge to the CPP1 platform. It is supported by a 3-leg jacket.

In addition to the central DP1 drilling and wellhead platform, four other wellhead platforms were installed in the field, each producing well fluids to the CPP1 platform.

Because the gas reservoir is shallow, and to avoid a large deviation of the wells, slant drilling is used. Two jack up drilling rigs were built to undertake 30 degree slant drilling. The rigs were Morecambe Flame and Bay Driller.

In 1984 a single drilling and production platform was installed in the Morecambe North field. 

The Bains field was developed in 2002 by a single subsea wellhead producing well fluids to DP1 via a 8.3 km 8-inch pipeline.

The North Morecambe platform was modified to tie in the Millom East / West and Dalton fields, and in 2013 the addition of the Rhyl field.

Production 
Well fluids from the wellhead platforms are piped to the CPP1 platform. Three phase separation into gas, condensate and water is undertaken. The gas is dehydrated using tri-ethylene glycol. Dry gas together with condensate is piped ashore.

Initial production from Morecambe South field in the winter of 1984-5 was 120 million standard cubic feet of gas per day (MMSCFD). This increased to 450 MMSCFD in the winter of 1985-6 and ultimately to 1,200 MMSCFD. The first year of peak production was 1993 when the South field produced 8.6 billion cubic metres per year.

The first year of peak production for the Morecambe North field was 1995 when the field produced 3.1 billion cubic metres of gas per year.

Decommissioning 
The decommissioning of the DP3 and DP4 platforms is currently (2021) underway.

See also 

 Rampside gas terminal

References 

Natural gas fields in the United Kingdom